Hamdy Wahiba (sometimes spelled as Hamdy Wheiba, Hamdy Wehieba or Hamdy El Wahiba), is a retired lieutenant general of the Egyptian Army. He served as the 17th chief of general staff in the Egyptian Armed Forces from 31 October 2001 to 29 October 2005. He also served as chairperson of the Arab Organization for Industrialization (AOI) from 2005 to 2012. Preceded by Magdy Hatata, Wahiba was previously appointed as commander of the Republican Guard in 1997. He was the sixth commander of the guard under Mubarak.

Biography 
Wahiba graduated from the Egyptian Military Academy in 1966, and subsequently joined infantry battalion, which participated in the Six-Day War. He also participated in the Yom Kippur War.

References

External links

Chiefs of the General Staff (Egypt)
Year of death missing
Place of birth missing
Egyptian Military Academy alumni